Luan de Assis Costa Leite (born 17 September 1988), known as Luan, is a Brazilian footballer who plays for Volta Redonda, as a defender.

External links

1988 births
Living people
Brazilian footballers
Brazilian expatriate footballers
Volta Redonda FC players
Goytacaz Futebol Clube players
Tombense Futebol Clube players
FC Zimbru Chișinău players
Associação Atlética Portuguesa (RJ) players
Botafogo Futebol Clube (PB) players
Moldovan Super Liga players
Campeonato Brasileiro Série C players
Campeonato Brasileiro Série D players
Association football defenders
Brazilian expatriate sportspeople in Moldova
Expatriate footballers in Moldova